The Mumbai–Nagpur High Speed Rail Corridor is a planned high-speed rail line connecting Maharashtra's two major cities, Mumbai and Nagpur. It will be the second line which links Mumbai.

The cost of the project is yet to be finalised.

Project status

2021
March: Aerial LiDar survey begins.

2022
February: DPR Submitted to Railway Board.

Route Description

The proposed Mumbai-Nagpur High Speed Rail Corridor is planned to run along Samruddhi Mahamarg Expressway, national highways, greenfield areas, and may pass through arterial roads of the intermediate city road network for high speed rail connectivity between different cities along the corridor.

Fares

The fare structure is yet to be finalized but is expected to be 1.5 times the existing first class AC fare on the Indian Railways’ current service. The line’s official fare structure, prices and rules are expected to be finalized closer to the start of commercial operations.

See also
High-speed rail in India
 Chennai-Bengaluru-Mysuru high-speed rail corridor
 Mumbai–Ahmedabad high-speed rail corridor
 Mumbai–Hyderabad high-speed rail corridor

References

External links
 Preliminary Study

High-speed railway lines in India
Standard gauge railways in India
Rail transport in Maharashtra
Proposed railway lines in India
Rail transport in Mumbai
Transport in Nagpur